Ouveillan is a commune in the Aude department in southern France.
 
Sights include the church of St. John the Evangelist, built in Romanesque style during the 11th-12th centuries. It has a large choir area with three apses, which are decorated externally with Lombard bands.

Population

See also
Communes of the Aude department

References

Communes of Aude
Aude communes articles needing translation from French Wikipedia